International School of Lyon (ISL) is an English-language international school in Sainte Foy-Lès-Lyon, France, near Lyon. The school serves preschool (beginning at age 3) through senior high school. It was established in March 2004.

References

External links

 International School of Lyon

International Baccalaureate schools in France
Secondary schools in France
2004 establishments in France
Educational institutions established in 2004
Education in Lyon